The Best of Muddy Waters is a greatest hits album by Muddy Waters released by Chess Records in April 1958. The twelve songs were originally issued as singles between 1948 and 1954 and most appeared in Billboard magazine's top 10 Rhythm & Blues Records charts.

The album is the first by Waters and the third by Chess on the long playing (or LP record) format. Chess re-sequenced the tracks and re-titled it Sail On for release in February 1969.

The album was re-released on compact disc in 1997 by Chess and MCA Records.  The Blues Foundation Hall of Fame inducted it as a "Classic of Blues Recording" in 1983.

Track listing

Personnel
Muddy Watersvocals, guitar
Ernest "Big" Crawfordbass on "Long Distance Call", "Louisiana Blues", "Honey Bee", "I Want You To Love Me", and "I Can't Be Satisfied"
Willie Dixonbass on "I Just Want To Make Love To You", "I'm Ready", and "I'm Your Hoochie Coochie Man"
Little Walterharmonica on tracks A-1, A-2, A-3, A-6, B-1, B-2, and B-4; guitar on B-5
Walter "Shakey" Hortonharmonica on B-3 (as credited on LP – Little Walter is the harmonica player on all tracks on this collection where harmonica is present.)
Jimmy Rogersguitar on tracks A-1, A-4, A-6, B-1, B-3, and B-4
Otis Spannpiano on A-1, A-6, B-1, B-3, and B-4
Fred Belowdrums on A-1, A-6, and B-1
Elgin Evans – washboard on A-3; drums on B-3 and B-4
Leonard Chessbass drum on B-2 and B-5
Studs Terkelliner notes

Release history

References 

Muddy Waters albums
1958 greatest hits albums
Albums produced by Leonard Chess
Albums produced by Phil Chess
Chess Records compilation albums